Robert Charles "Bob" Vaughan FRS (born 24 March 1945) is a British mathematician, working in the field of analytic number theory.

Life
Since 1999 he has been Professor at Pennsylvania State University, and since 1990 Fellow of the Royal Society. He did his PhD at the University of London under supervision of Theodor Estermann. He supervised Trevor Wooley's PhD.

Awards
In 2012, he became a fellow of the American Mathematical Society.

See also
Vaughan's identity

Writings

References

External links
 Robert C. Vaughan's Home page (includes CV and list of publications)

1945 births
Living people
Fellows of the Royal Society
Alumni of the University of London
Fellows of the American Mathematical Society